The Liga Puerto Rico (LPR) is an amateur football competition organized by the Puerto Rican Football Federation. It is the top division football league on the island. The champion qualifies to participate in the Caribbean Club Shield each season.

History
Following the absence of a football league in Puerto Rico for the 2017-18 season, the new Liga Puerto Rico was announced via Facebook by the Puerto Rico Football Federation in August 2018. Prior to the announcement, the federation organized a Preparatory Tournament that ran from March until June 2018. Ten teams participated in the tournament which was eventually won by Bayamón FC. The league's official launch event attended by FIFA and CONCACAF delegates was held on August 23, 2018 with the league set to begin play the following month.

The inaugural season saw Metropolitan FA beat Bayamón Fútbol Club in the championship match. The match went to penalty kicks which Metropolitan won 4–1 after a 0–0 draw in regulation time. The second season of the league began but was abandoned because of the COVID-19 pandemic. The league did not name a champion.

Prior to the 2021–22 season the league unveiled a new championship trophy designed by local artist Milton G. Rodriguez. A replica of the trophy, which is almost three feet tall and over one and a half feet wide, will be given to the champions each season while the original will remain with the Puerto Rican Football Federation.

Competition
The league's ten teams face each other two times. The first six teams of the league table will qualify for the playoffs with the first two getting a direct pass to the semifinals. The championship final will be contested as a single match. The champion each season will qualify for the CFU Club Championship.

Clubs

Current clubs
Thirteen clubs currently participate in the Liga Puerto Rico

Former clubs

Champions
Below is a list of Liga Puerto Rico Champions.

International competition
The following is a list of results for Liga Puerto Rico clubs in international competitions. LPR club scores are listed first.

Footnotes

References

 
Puerto Rico